Peter Watkinson is a former New Zealand rower.

At the 1962 British Empire and Commonwealth Games he won a silver medal in the double sculls, partnering his brother Murray. He worked as commercial traveller.

References

Year of birth missing (living people)
Living people
New Zealand male rowers
Rowers at the 1962 British Empire and Commonwealth Games
Commonwealth Games silver medallists for New Zealand
Commonwealth Games medallists in rowing
Medallists at the 1962 British Empire and Commonwealth Games